Andrej Mitikj  is a Macedonian handball player that plays for RK Metalurg Skopje. He just got promoted from Metlurg's B team to RK Metalurg Skopje.  His position is Pivot and he is considered as the future of the HC Metalurg .

References

Macedonian male handball players
2000 births
Living people